Abraham Abrahams (ca.1813 – 3 April 1892) was a painter and businessman in South Australia.

History
Abrahams was born in Sheerness, Kent, and was educated in Colchester, England, then went to work for Hyams & Co., clothing retailers of London, and became a commercial traveller for the company. In 1850 he emigrated to South Australia, where he went into business as an importer, taking Thompson (previously with Acraman & Co.) as a partner; dissolving the partnership around 1862. In 1864 he accepted positions as secretary to the Imperial Permanent Building Society for a short time, and to the Equitable Fire Insurance Company, which he held until 1891.

In 1880 he, with Catherine Helen Spence, William Kay and a few others, founded the Executor, Trustee, and Agency Company in South Australia, using Dutch companies in South Africa as a model, and was elected its manager, a post he held until September 1891, when forced to resign by failing eyesight.

He was a prominent philanthropist: he was treasurer of the Assyrian Fund and the Indian Relief Fund. He was on the board of the Home for Incurables, and secretary of the Society for the Prevention of Cruelty to Animals. He was one of the oldest members of the Jewish Synagogue in Adelaide, and at various times served as secretary and treasurer, though not as actively involved in later years. He was a founding member of the South Australian Society of Arts, its first treasurer, and its secretary 1866–1885. He was elected to the gazetted position on the Board of Governors of the Public Library in 1884 and served as chairman 1888–1889. He played a prominent part in the management of the Art Gallery and Zoological Gardens. He was a Justice of the Peace and a prominent Freemason.

Personal
He lived for twenty years at the York Hotel, Rundle Street. In January 1892, feeling the effects of a hot summer, he made a rare trip outside South Australia to Hobart, Tasmania, and died in Melbourne on the return voyage. He was buried in the Jewish section of the West Terrace Cemetery, Adelaide.

He was courtly and courteous, punctual to the point of punctiliousness, polite, precise and utterly dependable. He was a great lover of art, with a deep knowledge of the Old Masters, of which he owned a small but valuable collection. He never married.

Recognition
He was in 1881, in recognition of his service to art, presented with a portrait of himself, painted by J. A. Upton, which is held by the Art Gallery.

References 

1813 births
1892 deaths
Australian art collectors
19th-century Australian businesspeople
19th-century Australian philanthropists
Australian people of English-Jewish descent
Australian Jews
English Jews
English emigrants to colonial Australia
Jewish philanthropists
Settlers of South Australia
Burials at West Terrace Cemetery
People from Sheerness